Fish Leong (born Leong Chui Peng on 16 June 1978) is a Malaysian singer and songwriter. Having sold more than 20 million records to date, she has achieved popularity and success in China, Hong Kong, Taiwan, Japan, Singapore, and Malaysia.

Early life and breakthrough

Leong was born in Bahau, Negeri Sembilan, Malaysia. R&B singer Z-Chen is her older cousin. She debuted her singing career in Taiwan and signed to Rock Records in October 1997. She then adopted the English name "Fish", because the last character of her Chinese name "茹" sounds the same as "魚" (fish) in Cantonese. She was discovered by Jonathan Lee, who later also became her godfather. She received Mandarin training upon arriving in Taiwan as her mother tongue is Cantonese. Her debut album, Grown Up Overnight, was released in September 1999, but had many promotions cancelled due to the 1999 Taiwan earthquake. Her singing career managed to take off after the release of her second album, Courage (2000).

Personal life
In February 2010, Leong married Taiwanese wine merchant Tony Chao in Boracay, Philippines, and their child Anderson Chao was born in April 2014. On  September 8, 2019, Leong announced their divorce at a press conference for her new album in Taipei. She declined further comments on alleged cheating by Chao.

Discography

Studio albums
 Grown Up Overnight (1999)
 Courage (2000)
 Shining Star (2001)
 Sunrise (2002)
 Beautiful (2003)
 Wings of Love (2004)
 Silkroad of Love (2005)
 Kissing the Future of Love (2006) 
 J'Adore (2007)
 Fall in Love & Songs (2009)
 What Love Songs Didn't Tell You (2010)
 Love in Heart (2012) 
 The Sun Also Rises (2019)

Compilation albums
 The Power of Love (2003)
 I Love You Hereafter (2011)
 Her Story With Mayday (2015), cover album with various artists presenting "Tenderness"

Live albums
 Time & Love (2002)
 Love Parade (2005)
 Today Is Our Valentine's Day (2008)

EP
 The Sonnet of Three Days (2021)

Collaborations
 "Songs of the Earth" (1998) - with Alex To, Bobby Chen, Chyi Yu, Karen Mok, Mayday, Michael Wong, Richie Jen, Victor Wong, Rene Liu, Wakin Chau, Wanfang, Winnie Hsin, Angelica Lee, Fengie Wang, Bobby Dou, Tarcy Su, Walkie Talkie
 "Love" (2000) - with Rene Liu from I'll Be Waiting for You
 "I Love You Very Much" (2004) - with Victor Wong from Door Unlocked
 "Way Back into Love" (2007) - with Victor Wong from Need You Most (between English version and Mandarin version)
 "Still Good Friends" (2008) - with Leo Ku from Still the Master of Love Songs, as well from her EP, I Do?
 "Love x Love" (2012) - with Will Pan, Da Mouth (vocal: Harry & Aisa Senda), Cyndi Wang, Rachel Liang, Lee Chien-na, OneTwoFree, Jane Huang, Vision Wei, Bibi Zhou and Jason Zhang
 "Meant to Be" (2016) - with Christine Fan from Fanfan's Time to Give Thanks

Filmography

Film

Television series

Variety and reality show

References

External links

 
 
 

1978 births
Living people
21st-century Malaysian women singers
Malaysian people of Cantonese descent
Malaysian Mandopop singers
People from Negeri Sembilan
Universal Music Group artists
Malaysian expatriates in Taiwan
20th-century Malaysian women singers